Alarazbum (also Romanized as Alārazbūm and Alārz Būm; also known as Alārazbīm) is a village in Shohada Rural District, Yaneh Sar District, Behshahr County, Mazandaran Province, Iran. At the 2006 census, its population was 45, in 11 families.

References 

Populated places in Behshahr County